Dastaan-E-Mohabbat: Salim Anarkali (Story Of Love: Salim Anarkali) is an Indian historical television series that aired on Colors TV. Created by Ludhiana Pathak's Writer's Galaxy Studios, it premiered on 1 October 2018. Starring Shaheer Sheikh and Sonarika Bhadoria, the show explores the historical love story of Prince Salim and Anarkali.

them and foretells that Salim will be  things to happen.

When dacoits attack the village of Agra, a girl named Saifu (Naisa Khanna) and her aunt Jhillan (Shruti Ulfat) save Salim as they flee.  'blossomed pomegranate'. The seer also foretold that Anarkali will be the reason of the feud between Akbar and Salim. As they return to Agra, Salim and Anarkali become best friends. While Jodha and Akbar are happy to see Salim with his new-found friend, Akbar's first wife, Ruqaiya, (Tasneem Sheikh) and Akbar's mother Hamida (Aruna Irani) are enraged to see the niece of a servant playing with Salim. When Ruqaiya plots to kill Salim, Anarkali saves him once more.

Later, after Salim begins misbehaving when Ruqaiya puts rohypnal in his milk, Akbar decides to send him to the battlefield for 12 years until he is grown-up. Salim leaves the castle and is angry with his father's decision. However, Anarkali tearfully bids adieu to Salim and decides to write him letters throughout the 12 years in which all of this takes place.

12 Years Later 

Prince Salim (Shaheer Sheikh) is now grown up and he is a brave and talented warrior who can single-handedly kill ten soldiers. Though ferocious, Salim has the soft heart of Jodha, and knows how to forgive. Salim's best friend is the Hindu warrior, Mahabbat (Meherzan Mazda), with whom Salim shares all his secrets. Anarkali (Sonarika Bhadoria), who is also grown-up, is a shy, soft-spoken, beautiful servant of Agra palace, and extremely close to Jodha. She writes letters to Salim every week, although she never gets a reply from him.

Though Anarkali loves Salim, she never expresses her desires. She knows that as a servant, she can never even dream of becoming the queen of Salim's heart. Although Ruqaiya hates Anarkali and frequently tries to defame her, Anarkali has nothing harsh against anyone. Jodha receives the news of Salim's homecoming and requests Anarkali to decorate Salim's room.

Salim returns and after meeting Jodha, he expresses his desire to meet Anarkali. Salim meets Anarkali at the terrace and is absolutely smitten with her. Although Anarkali is reluctant to see Salim again, Salim insists upon meeting her. This gives Ruqaiya an opportunity to make Anarkali fall in Salim's eyes. The next day, Ruqaiya orders Anarkali to dance with another dancer at a party arranged to celebrate Salim's homecoming. Salim is absolutely furious to see Anarkali as a rakkasha (prostitute) and slaps her in front of everyone. Salim leaves, followed by Mahabbat.

However, Mahabbat succeeds in making Salim understand that he was always in love with Anarkali. Salim decides to confess his feelings to Anarkali, who then requests that Salim leaves her alone, fearing that her worst nightmare will come true. A stubborn Salim tries to win over Anarkali and is successful. At last, Salim decides to give up, but before he does, he decides to make Anarkali confess her true feelings for him. He orders Mahabbat to arrange a party in the jungle, and to order Anarkali to come with them. Salim also arranges a dancer named Firdous to make Anarkali jealous. While Firdous's dances, Salim notices Anarkali's jealousy, but she still remains silent.

Salim orders everyone to get out of the tent except Anarkali. Salim asks her why she was still silent. Anarkali replies that she is just a servant and cannot tell Salim what to do and what not. A frustrated Salim decides to make the tent catch fire and kill himself. However, this incident makes Anarkali weak, and she confesses her love for him. Hamida, after receiving the news of the fire incident, decides to meet Salim but is stunned to see him hugging Anarkali. She learns of their affair and decides to end it. Firdous, as revealed is a plot planted by Ruqaiya, tells her about Salim's love for Anarkali.

Ruqaiya asks Firdous to create a rift between them, but Firdous refuses and says she will not come between the two lovers. Ruqaiya kills Firdous. Akbar calls Nigris Jaan to teach dance to Anarkali. Firstly, Nigris behaves rudely with Anarkali but later, when she realises her love for Salim, she starts helping her. Then, Maan Bai, Salim's cousin enters and is successful in marrying him. She becomes Salim's first wife and starts creating the rift between Salim and Anarkali, but is unsuccessful. She even tries to kill Anarkali but Anarkali is saved by Salim. Maan Bai tells Akbar about their affair; he becomes furious and tells Anarkali to go away from Salim if she wants to save her life. But, later she is stabbed in her stomach and dies in the arms of Salim.

Cast

Main
 Shaheer Sheikh as Jahangir / Prince Salim, Akbar and Jodha's son and Anarkali's lover
 Uzair Basar as Young Jahangir / Prince Salim
 Sonarika Bhadoria as Saifu / Anarkali, Salim's lover
 Naisa Khanna as Young Saifu / Anarkali

Recurring
 Heli Daruwala as Maan Bai / Shah Begum, Salim's maternal cousin later first wife
 Gurdeep Kohli Punj as Mariam-uz-ZamaniJodha  later first wife
 Parvati Sehgal as Salima Sultan Begum, Akbar's cousin turned second wife
 Aruna Irani as Hamida Banu Begum / Badi Begum, Humayun's wife and Akbar's mother
 Shruti Ulfat as Jhillan, Anarkali's maternal aunt
 Piyush Sahdev as Abu'l-Fazl ibn Mubarak
 Meherzan Mazda as Mahabbat, Salim's friend
 Karan Sharma as Raja Man Singh I.
 Hemant Choudhary as Bhagwant Das, Jodha's brother and Maan's father
 Rachana Mistry as Husna, Anarkali's friend
 Anand Goradia as Khanam, Ruqaiya's aide
 Ankita Srivastava as Firdaus

Guests
 Sayantani Ghosh as Nargis Jaan
 Chirag Jani as Hakim Mirza
 Riya Shukla

International broadcast 
 In Indonesia (Indonesian), it began airing on ANTV with the title Salim Anarkali from 11 March 2019 to 11 April 2019.

References

External links 
Watch Dastaan-E-Mohabbat Salim Anarkali on Voot

Hindi-language television shows
2018 Indian television series debuts
Colors TV original programming
Mughal Empire in fiction
Cultural depictions of Akbar
Indian historical television series
2019 Indian television series endings
Television series set in the 16th century
Cultural depictions of Jahangir